Drag Queen Story Hour (DQSH), Drag Queen Storytime, Drag Story Time, and Drag Story Hour are children's events first started in 2015 by author and activist Michelle Tea in San Francisco with the goals of promoting reading and diversity. The events, usually geared for children aged 3–11, are hosted by drag queens who read children’s books, and engage in other learning activities in public libraries. Some see the concept as unconventional since libraries are usually more reserved and the queens usually host nightlife events rather than leading sing-alongs.

Jonathan Hamilt, who co-founded the New York chapter as a nonprofit, said that as of June 2019, DSH has 35 U.S. and five international chapters. The program strives to "capture the imagination and play of gender fluidity of childhood and gives kids glamorous, positive, and unabashedly queer role models".

The practice has been criticized as "grooming" by social conservatives and is illegal in the state of Tennessee.

History 
Drag Story Hour started in 2015 in San Francisco, and was created by author Michelle Tea, then the executive director of the nonprofit Radar Productions; the first events were organized by Juliàn Delgado Lopera and Virgie Tovar.  Tea, who identifies as queer, came up with the idea after attending children's library events with her newborn son and finding them welcoming but heteronormative. She imagined an event that was more inclusive and affirming to LGBTQ families. The first event was held at the Eureka Valley/Harvey Milk Memorial Branch Library in the LGBT Castro neighborhood of San Francisco and featured drag queen Persia and was well received. Other early DSH events in San Francisco featured several drag queens of color, including Honey Mahogany, Yves St. Croissant, and Panda Dulce. As of February 2020, there are 50+ official chapters of DSH, spread internationally, as well as other drag artists holding reading events at libraries, schools, bookstores, and museums. In October 2022, the nonprofit organization officially changed its name to Drag Story Hour, to be more inclusive and "reflect the diverse cast of storytellers."

In 2017 the New York chapter incorporated as a non-profit and has received funds from the New York Public Library, Brooklyn Public Library, and two city council members. The funds buy books, some DSH events do book giveaways, go for paying the queens, and training to ensure the queens "talk effectively to children and their parents about gender identity and drag."

In 2017 and 2018, the organization had a convicted child sex offender perform in the Houston Public Library. The library had failed to do the background check that is part of its usual process for storytellers. The library apologized and recognized its shortcoming in not properly vetting the performer in question.

The books read include children's classics and works featuring LGBT characters and issues. One popular book at DSH is This Day in June, written by Gayle Pitman and illustrated by Kristyna Litten, which introduces the reader to the idea of an LGBTQ pride parade. Pitman also authored Sewing the Rainbow, about rainbow flag creator Gilbert Baker, she is also on faculty at Sacramento City College teaching psychology and women and gender studies. She feels it important to teach LGBTQ kids, including children in LGBTQ families, about subjects outside two tropes she's seen: gay and lesbian parents; and gender non-conforming children, like in 10,000 Dresses. Pitman feels that children are smarter than given credit for, and can understand complex issues like intersex bodies, if the explanation is simplified.

In March 2020, in response to the COVID-19 pandemic which had accompanying 'shelter in place' and 'avoid group gatherings' orders, DSHs were among events postponed. Nina West and other drag queens started live-streaming readings. West authored the children’s album Drag Is Magic, featured RED: A Crayon Story by Michael Hall as the first book of the online series. RED is about “a crayon who suffers an identity crisis when he is labeled wrong.”

Reception
DSH events have met with opposition towards the drag queens and the books being read. An event organizer and performer noted: "Just like an actor can do an R-rated movie and a G-rated kids’ movie, we have different levels of how we entertain and how we can put on our character as well."

John Casey, an adjunct professor at Wagner College in New York City, posits in The Advocate,

In a May 2019 First Things article and a subsequent debate with David A. French, Sohrab Ahmari argued that drag queen story hours presented a challenge to proponents of "conservative liberalism" who emphasized personal autonomy and opposed "the use of the public power to advance the common good, including in the realm of public morality". Steven Greenhut responded in a Whittier Daily News editorial that, although he perceived the story hours to be "bizarre and agenda driven", banning them would be an overreach of governmental power and an attempt to legislate morality. In August 2019, a petition by LifeSiteNews and Personhood Alliance, both pro-life activism groups, asked the American Library Association (ALA) to stop promoting the story hours; it gathered nearly 100,000 signatures. The ALA responded by affirming its support for DSH events, stating that it "strongly opposes any effort to limit access to information, ideas and programmes that patrons wish to explore" and "includes a commitment to combating marginalisation and underrepresentation within the communities served by libraries through increased understanding of the effects of historical exclusion."

According to progressive news website ThinkProgress, "it has been a common tactic among the far right to disrupt DSH". In June 2019, the Southern Poverty Law Center (SPLC) reported that "white nationalist and former U.S. Congressional candidate Paul Nehlen had announced on June 19 a plan he called 'PROJECT DOX TRANNY STORYTIME.'" Nehlen urged followers to gather photos and vehicle license plates of DSH participants for doxing, the Internet-based practice of researching and broadcasting private or identifying information (especially personally identifying information) about an individual. The SPLC reported that events such as DSH were "a big draw for far-right extremists". In April 2019, two members of the white nationalist group American Identity Movement (formerly Identity Evropa) dressed as clowns and disrupted a DSH in New Orleans, Louisiana.

Drag for children 
Nina West, RuPaul’s Drag Race season eleven contestant and winner of Miss Congeniality, and producer of Drag Is Magic, an EP of kids music about the art form, says she hopes to inspire them to "dream big, be kind, and be their perfect selves." West feels drag is "an opportunity for children to get creative and think outside the boxes us silly adults have crafted for them." Marti Gould Cummings said something similar when a video of them performing "Baby Shark" at a drag brunch went viral. "Anyone who thinks drag isn’t for children is wrong" said Cummings, "Drag is expression, and children are such judgment-free beings; they don’t really care what you’re wearing, just what you’re performing." As of May 2019, the video has been viewed over 806,000 times.

West has responded to critics who question if children are too young to experience drag, saying, "Drag is an opportunity for anyone – including and especially children – to reconsider the masks we are all forced to wear daily.” West added, "Children are inundated with implicit imagery from media about what is 'boy' and what is 'girl.' And I believe that almost all kids are really less concerned about playing with a toy that's supposedly aligned to their gender, and more concerned with playing with toys that speak to them."

The New York Times noted "Laura Edwards-Leeper, a clinical psychologist in Oregon who works with queer and trans kids, said that experimenting with gender expression isn't necessarily linked to being queer or trans." and "It's normal at basically any age for boys to dress up as princesses and girls in male superhero outfits". She argues that what changed is parenting: "When there's no judgment, kids are more likely to feel free to explore".

See also 

 2022 drag performance protests

References

External links 

 American Library Association resources for Drag Queen Story Hour
 Official site

Public libraries
Drag events
Social phenomena
LGBT-related controversies in the United States